Jamil Moledina is a businessman who works in the video game industry. Moledina has worked in senior management roles for the Game Developers Conference, EA Partners, and mobile gaming companies Funzio and Wormhole Games, the latter of which he co-founded.

Career 
Prior to working for the Game Developers Conference (GDC), Moledina was editor-in-chief of Game Developer magazine. He became executive director of the GDC in 2005, and directed the conference, as well as the Independent Games Festival and the Game Developers Choice Awards, for three years. In 2008, he became director of business development for EA Partners co-publishing program at Electronic Arts. There, he negotiated a deal to publish the indie games Shank and DeathSpank in 2010. Moledina also previously sat on the board of directors of the International Game Developers Association, having been elected in 2009.

Moledina left EA Partners in 2011 and became vice president of business development of mobile gaming company Funzio. The company was acquired by GREE in 2012, and Moledina left the company one month after its acquisition. Later that year, he co-founded Wormhole Games, which first published the tablet game Tank Nation in 2013. In 2014, the company announced that it would be shutting down, with Moledina accepting a position at Google. At Google, Moledina held the role of games strategic lead for Google Play.

Personal life 
Moledina was born in Mombasa, Kenya to parents of Indian descent, and was raised in London and Los Angeles. He is also a science fiction writer.

References

External links 
 

American people of Indian descent
American businesspeople
Video game businesspeople
Game Developers Conference
Living people
Year of birth missing (living people)
American people of Kenyan descent